Gibbs Lake may refer to:

 Gibbs Lake (New York)
 Gibbs Lake (Wisconsin)